Ayub Medical Complex may refer to:

 Ayub Teaching Hospital
 Ayub Medical College
 Institute of Nuclear Medicine, Oncology and Radiotherapy